Cristian Gustavo Leiva (born 26 September 1977) is an Argentine football midfielder who plays for Americo Tesorieri.

External links
Statistics at Guardian Stats Centre
Cristian Leiva at Football Lineups
 Argentine Primera statistics

Argentine footballers
Association football midfielders
Club Atlético Banfield footballers
Cruz Azul footballers
Club de Gimnasia y Esgrima La Plata footballers
R.S.C. Anderlecht players
R. Charleroi S.C. players
Club Olimpia footballers
Godoy Cruz Antonio Tomba footballers
San Lorenzo de Almagro footballers
Arsenal de Sarandí footballers
Expatriate footballers in Paraguay
Sportspeople from La Rioja Province, Argentina
1977 births
Living people
Argentine Primera División players
Belgian Pro League players
Argentine expatriate footballers
Expatriate footballers in Belgium
Expatriate footballers in Mexico